Ratangarh Mata Temple is a Hindu temple in Datia, Madhya Pradesh, India. It is dedicated to Shakti.

History 
It is believed that Samarth Ramdas, guru of Maratha king Shivaji, camped here to plan Shivaji's rescue from Agra Fort in 1666. Shivaji's cavalry commandos brought him at Ratangarh Mata Temple after the rescue as it was too dense of a jungle for the Mughal army to comb.

Stampede 

October 13, 2013, a stampede broke out during the Navratri festival, near the Ratangarh Mata Temple, killing 115 people and injuring more than 100.

See also 
 2013 Madhya Pradesh stampede
 List of human stampedes

References

External links
 Official website

Hindu temples in Madhya Pradesh
Datia district
https://ratangarhmata.in/